Scotaeus is a genus of darkling beetles (insects in the family Tenebrionidae).

Species
Species within this genus include:
 Scotaeus corallipes Hope, 1834
 Scotaeus dentipennis Gebien, 1935
 Scotaeus focalis Gebien, 1935
 Scotaeus fruhstorferi Gebien, 1935
 Scotaeus seriatopunctatus Heller, 1898
 Scotaeus xestothorax Heller, 1899

References

Tenebrionidae genera